Toolroom Knights is a compilation album by Italian house music DJ/producer Benny Benassi. The album charted on Billboard's Dance/Electronic Albums chart, peaking at #21 on 21 February 2009.

Track listing 
CD1:

"Panic Attack"  4:43
"We Love This Disco Sound (Cut N Rub Dub)" 4:48
"LookLookLook (In Flagranti Remix)" 4:46
"Hi Friend" 5:44
"Electro Sixteen" 5:31
"Freeze" 4:42
"Lava Lava (Feadz Aval Aval Remix)" 4:01
"Sunglasses at Night (Popof Remix 2)" 4:13
"Stay The Same (Alex Gopher Dub)" 4:31
"Are You Ready? (Laidback Luke Remix)" 5:44
"Kosimo" 5:12
"Gas Face (Japanese Popstars Remix)" 6:12
"Aurora (Shinichi Osawa Remix)" 5:09

CD2:
"I'll Work Ya Babe" 5:45
"Control" 4:45
"88" 5:00
"Enjoy The Silence (Workidz Remix)" 5:30
"Technik (Richard Murray's Lil Muz Remix)" 5:00
"Azteca" 5:07
"Nothing But Love (Tiger Stripes Remix)" 6:00
"Golden Walls" 5:15
"The Ridge (Tommy Trash Remix)" 5:32
"Quantum" 6:30
"Girls Suckcces (Dub Mix)" 6:07
"Music Matters (Axwell Remix)" 6:52
"Excuses" 5:46

References

External links

Benny Benassi albums
2009 compilation albums